Aunt Flo is a popular euphemism referring to menstruation. It may also refer to:

Characters

 A character in the British television series ...And Mother Makes Three
 A character in the children's television series Bod
 A character in the 1984 short story "Gramma" by Stephen King
 A character in the television series The Mary Tyler Moore Show
 A character in the 2007 book Pontoon: A Novel of Lake Wobegon by Garrison Keillor
 A character in the animated series South Park
 A character in the American sketch comedy television series Wonder Showzen